Boy with a Spinning-Top or Child with a Teetotum is a 1738 oil-on-canvas painting by Jean Siméon Chardin, now in the Louvre in Paris, which acquired it in 1907.

It is based on a 1735 work now in the São Paulo Museum of Art and shows Auguste-Gabriel, son of the jeweller Charles Godefroy, contemplating a teetotum or spinning top. The painting is in line with Age of Enlightenment ideas on childhood and play, especially those of Jean-Jacques Rousseau. On the table in the background are an inkwell, a pen and books, whilst a drawer in the table is open to show a porte-crayon.

References

1738 paintings
Paintings by Jean-Baptiste-Siméon Chardin
Paintings of children
Portrait paintings in the Louvre
Paintings in the Louvre by French artists
Books in art